Yoann Bourillon (born 9 January 1982) is a French former professional footballer who played as a midfielder.

Career
Bourillon was born in Laval. He played nearly 80 games professionally for Stade Laval in Ligue 2, and for four seasons in Championnat de France Amateur with Racing Besançon. When Racing Besançon were relegated to CFA 2 for financial reasons, he signed for fellow CFA club US Avranches.

In 2010 Bourillon signed for another CFA side La Vitréenne, where he played for two seasons, with the team being relegated to CFA 2 at the end of the 2011–12 season. in June 2012 he signed for a fourth CFA side, Romorantin.

In June 2015, Bourillon joined Stade Briochin to work again with coach Sylvain Didot, with whom he had previously worked at Avranches.

Personal life
His younger brother Grégory Bourillon is also a professional footballer.

References

1982 births
Living people
French footballers
Association football midfielders
Ligue 2 players
Championnat National 2 players
Championnat National 3 players
Stade Lavallois players
Racing Besançon players
US Avranches players
La Vitréenne FC players
SO Romorantin players
Stade Briochin players